Tsada (earlier (before 1985) written Tsadha)  is a relatively big village 8 km North of Paphos city center. Although the proximity between them, the  612 m elevation difference gives to the Tsada area a totally different identity. It receives  of rainfall annually. The climate is much cooler all year long (during  the hot and humid summers in Paphos the temperature gap can reach 6 °C) and it also is one of the few areas in the Paphos District that snows almost every year by the end of January. Tsada was the home village of EOKA national hero Evagoras Pallikarides. Although the history of the village can be counted 500 years ago, there is no significant architectural character, and only a few residences were reconstructed in the traditional way. It can be said that the only thing that makes the village special is the astonishing view towards Paphos and its sea.
Currently mass development is taking place in nearby hills, with villas being constructed over the last 5 years. The Melisovouno hill between Tsada and Koili village hosts Paphos television and radio antenna.

In Tsada, the climate is warm and temperate. The winter months are much rainier than the summer months in Tsada. This location is classified as Csa by Köppen Climate Classification. Situated at an altitude of 605 meters, in a landscape overlooking the sea and a climate that favors the cultivation of vines, grain, carob trees, olive trees, walnuts, almonds and many fruit trees, Tsada of the approximately 1,000 inhabitants is one of the “villages of Minthi“, as well as one of the largest ampelochoria (vine growing villages of Cyprus) in the area. Together with Episkopi of Paphos, Kallepia and the Minthis Hills tourist project, they are essentially a community “cooperative” under a common umbrella with the mutual goal to highlight their history, tradition and their unique natural environment. As a matter of fact, these villages have released a guide with tourist information and hiking trails in the Ezousa valley, showcasing the place as a rural tourism area.

Climate

Landmarks
There is a 12th-century chapel just outside the village that used to be a part of a monastery. Nowadays, "Stavros tis Minthis" is right next to an 18-hole golf course, Minthis Hills, the first ever created in Cyprus.  Here a resort will be created.
To the west of the village stands the 613m Tsiárta mountain.

Transportation
Tsada lies next to a transportation hub linking most of Paphos district's villages. It is next to the current route from Paphos to Polis, and to the main route towards traditional villages like Kallepia and Choulou. There is a bus connection to both Paphos and the Polis − Lachi area on a daily basis. By 2010 Tsada will be accessible via the A7 which is planned to give Polis a Motorway link. Moutti Tou Naki street is one of the busiest arteries of the village.

References

Communities in Paphos District
Paphos